Heemstede Castle (Dutch: Slot Heemstede) is the site of the old castle of Heemstede. The property is situated at the site of the former castle 'Heerlijkheid Heemstede', or 'Huis te Heemstede', at a strategic position on mouth of the Spaarne river on the Haarlem lake (since 1853 pumped dry and called the Haarlemmermeer polder).

History
The castle was first built in 1280 by Dirk van Hoylede from the region of Vlaardingen. Built, burned and rebuilt over the centuries, it was last torn down in 1810, after years of neglect. The monumental gatekeeper's house 'Nederhuys', built in 1630 remains intact as well as the foundations from the Middle Ages.

Adrian Pauw
The most famous owner of the castle was Adriaan Pauw, who bought it in 1620. He played a role in the Treaty of Münster, and built the bridge Pons Pacis to commemorate the peace treaty.

See also
List of castles in the Netherlands

References 
 Kransber, D. & H. Mils, Kastelengids van Nederland, middeleeuwen, Bussem 1979
 Kalkwiek, K.A., A.I.J.M. Schellart, H.P.H. Jansen & P.W. Geudeke, Atlas van de Nederlandse kastelen, Alphen aan den Rijn 1980
 Helsdingen, H.W. van, Gids voor de Nederlandse kastelen en buitenplaatsen, Amsterdam 1966
 Tromp, H.M.J., Kijk op kastelen Amsterdam 1979

External links 

 

Castles in North Holland
Rijksmonuments in Heemstede